Armand Anthony Assante Jr. (born October 4, 1949) is an American actor. He played mobster John Gotti in the 1996 HBO television film Gotti, Odysseus in the 1997 mini-series adaptation of Homer's The Odyssey, Nietzsche in When Nietzsche Wept, and Mickey Spillane's Mike Hammer in 1982's I, the Jury. His performance in Gotti earned him a Primetime Emmy Award and nominations for the Golden Globe Award and the Screen Actors Guild Award.

Early life
Assante was born in New York City and raised in Cornwall, New York, the son of Armand Anthony Assante Sr. (1922–2017), a painter and artist, and Katharine (née Healy; 1921–2011), a music teacher, English teacher and poet. He is of Italian and Irish descent.

Career
During the 1970s, Assante was a regular on two NBC soap operas, How to Survive a Marriage as Johnny McGhee and The Doctors as Mike Powers. His first film was The Lords of Flatbush (1974), although his work did not appear in the final cut of the film and the end credits misspelled his last name as Assanti. He starred in The Prophecy, 1975. His first on-screen role was playing Sylvester Stallone's brother in Paradise Alley and a role that brought him greater attention came in 1980's Private Benjamin as a handsome Frenchman who becomes the love interest of a U.S. soldier played by Goldie Hawn. In 1984 he portrayed the playboy violin virtuoso Maximillian Stein in the Dudley Moore comedy vehicle Unfaithfully Yours.

Assante has played a number of tough hero characters, such as his starring role as private eye Mike Hammer in the film I, the Jury (1982) as well as Mafia gangsters such as Michael Moretti in Sidney Sheldon's Rage of Angels. In 1990 his role as Roberto Texador in Sidney Lumet's film Q&A garnered him a Golden Globe nomination, and the following year he portrayed Bugsy Siegel in Neil Simon's The Marrying Man (1991). The following year he was seen as mafia boss Carol D'Allesandro in Hoffa (1992) starring Jack Nicholson, and crime kingpin John Gotti in the 1996 made-for-television biopic Gotti, for which he won his Primetime Emmy Award for Outstanding Lead Actor in a Miniseries or a Movie.

In addition to mafia and "tough-guy" roles, Assante has appeared in historical dramas, such as Napoleon Bonaparte in 1987's Napoleon and Josephine: A Love Story opposite Jacqueline Bisset, the heroic Odysseus in The Odyssey, Friedrich Nietzsche in the film adaptation of Irving Yalom's novel When Nietzsche Wept, and as Sanchez, Queen Isabella's Minister of State, in 1492: Conquest of Paradise.

Other film appearances include one as a Cuban bandleader in The Mambo Kings opposite Antonio Banderas and in the adaptation of the science-fiction story Judge Dredd with Sylvester Stallone, his co-star in Paradise Alley. He appeared in the 2007 film American Gangster with Denzel Washington and Russell Crowe. He had a recurring guest star role in several episodes of NCIS, playing the international arms dealer René Benoit. He has also appeared in the 2009 horror film Smile as the mysterious Tollinger. Outside of the U.S., he has participated in several film projects and humanitarian endeavors in Romania, Bulgaria, North Macedonia, Serbia, Croatia, Bosnia-Herzegovina, Kazakhstan, and Uzbekistan.

Other work
In 2013, Assante became a partner in his own premium cigar brand known as Ora Vivo Cigars.

Personal life
From 1982 to 1994, Assante was married to Karen McArn, with whom he had two daughters: Anya (born 1983) and Alesandra (born 1988). He has dated Dyan Cannon, Mara Venier and Vanessa Constantino.

Filmography

Film

Television series

Awards and nominations

In 2010, Assante received a star on the Italian Walk of Fame in Toronto, Ontario, Canada.

References

External links

1949 births
Living people
American Academy of Dramatic Arts alumni
American male film actors
American male soap opera actors
American male television actors
American male voice actors
American people of Irish descent
American people of Italian descent
Male actors from New York City
People from Cornwall, New York
Outstanding Performance by a Lead Actor in a Miniseries or Movie Primetime Emmy Award winners
20th-century American male actors
21st-century American male actors